The gens Fonteia was a plebeian family at ancient Rome.  Members of this gens are first mentioned toward the end of the third century BC; Titus Fonteius was a legate of Publius Cornelius Scipio during the Second Punic War.  The first of the Fonteii to obtain the consulship was Gaius Fonteius Capito, consul suffectus in 33 BC.

Origin
In his oration, Pro Fonteio, Cicero mentions that the Fonteii came originally from Tusculum, of which municipium it was one of the most distinguished families.  The Fonteii claimed descent from Fontus, the son of Janus.  A two-faced head appears on a coin of Gaius Fonteius, which Jean Foy Vaillant and others suppose to be the head of Janus, in reference to this tradition.  But as Janus is always represented in later times with a beard, Eckhel maintains that the two heads refer to the Dioscuri, who were worshipped at Tusculum with especial honours, and who may be regarded as the Di Penates of the gens.  Michael Crawford likewise favours a depiction of the Dioscuri, instead of Fontus, as they appear on other coins of the Fonteii.

Praenomina
The Fonteii used the praenomina Titus, Publius, Marcus, Gaius, Manius, and Lucius.

Branches and cognomina

The Fonteii bore the cognomens Agrippa, Balbus, and Capito, which is the only cognomen which occurs on coins of this gens.  The cognomen Crassus is an error of the manuscripts, since there were no Fonteii Crassi.

The Fonteii Balbi were not related to the other Fonteii as an inscription found in Etruria tells that they belonged to the tribe Sabatina – prevalent in this area – whilst the other Fonteii were from Tusculum, associated with the tribe Papiria.

Members

 Titus Fonteius was legate of Publius Cornelius Scipio in Spain, BC 212.  After Scipio's defeat and death, the soldiers chose Lucius Marcius to lead them, in place of Fonteius, who was the senior officer of the legions.  However, Fonteius remained second in command, and if he is the same Fonteius mentioned by Frontinus, he was a brave, if not an able officer.
 Marcus Fonteius, praetor of Sardinia, BC 166.
 Manius Fonteius C. f., a senator circa 164 BC.
 Gaius Fonteius, triumvir monetalis in 114 or 113 BC. He was then legate of the praetor Gnaeus Servilius Caepio, with whom he was slain in a popular tumult at Asculum in Picenum on the breaking out of the Social War in 90.
 Manius Fonteius, triumvir monetalis in 108 or 107 BC, probably a brother or cousin of Gaius Fonteius, the moneyer of c.114.
 Marcus Fonteius C. f.,  before 87 BC, even though he did not mint coins.  He was praetor in an uncertain year, and propraetor in Gallia Narbonensis from 76 to 73 BC.  He was prosecuted for extortion and misgovernment in 69, and defended by Cicero.
 Manius Fonteius C. f.,  in 85 BC.  He was possibly the military tribune named on a denarius of Publius Fonteius Capito in 55.
 Fonteia C. f., a Vestal Virgin in 69 BC, and sister of Marcus and Manius Fonteius, defended by Cicero in his oration, Pro Fonteio.  Cicero produced Fonteia at her brother's trial, to move the compassion of the judges.
 Publius Fonteius, a youth of obscure family, whom Publius Clodius Pulcher chose for his adopted father, although Fonteius was only twenty years old, and Clodius was thirty-five.  The object was to permit Clodius, a patrician, to pass over to the plebeians and serve as tribune of the plebs.  The adoption, though illegal and absurd, was passed in BC 60, and Fonteius' first and only paternal act was to emancipate his adopted son.
 Fonteius Magnus, probably a native of Bithynia, was a pleader of causes, and one of the accusers of Varenus Rufus for extortion while proconsul of Bithynia.  The younger Plinius defended Varenus, and Fonteius spoke in reply.

Fonteii Capitones

 Titus Fonteius Capito was praetor in BC 178, and obtained the command in Hispania Ulterior, which was left to him also for the year following, with the title of proconsul.
 Publius Fonteius Capito was praetor in BC 169, and obtained Sardinia as his province.
 Publius Fonteius P. f. Capito,  in 55 BC.  From the symbolism of his coins, it appears that he was a supporter of Cicero and possibly a relative of Titus Didius, the consul of 98.  He should not be confused with the adoptive father of Publius Clodius Pulcher, considering Cicero's enmity toward him.
 Gaius Fonteius C. f. Capito, consul  in 33 BC.  He is probably the same Gaius Fonteius Capito who accompanied Maecenas in 37 BC, when the latter was dispatched by Octavian to restore friendship between himself and Marcus Antonius.
 Gaius Fonteius C. f. C. n. Capito, consul in AD 12, together with Germanicus.  Afterward he was appointed proconsul of Asia.  In 25, he was accused by Vibius Severus of maladministration during his government of Asia, but Fonteius was acquitted due to lack of evidence.
 Gaius Fonteius C. f. C. n. Capito, consul in AD 59.
 Fonteius C. f. C. n. Capito, consul in AD 67.  May be the same Fonteius Capito who was put to death in Germania during the reign of Galba, in AD 68, on the ground of having attempted to excite an insurrection.

Fonteii Balbi

 Publius Fonteius Balbus, praetor in Spain, BC 168.
 Marcus Fonteius C. f. Balbus, only known from an inscription. He was perhaps the same as the praetor of Sardinia in BC 166.

Fonteii Agrippae 

 Gaius Fonteius Agrippa, one of the accusers of Marcus Scribonius Libo in AD 16.  In 19, he offered his daughter for a Vestal Virgin.
 Fonteia C. f., offered for a Vestal Virgin in AD 19.
 Gaius Fonteius (C. f.) Agrippa, proconsul of Asia in AD 69, he was recalled by Vespasian and placed over Moesia in 70.  He was shortly afterwards killed in battle by the Sarmatians.

See also
 List of Roman gentes

References

Bibliography 

 Marcus Tullius Cicero, Epistulae ad Atticum, Pro Fonteio, Pro Domo Sua.
 Titus Livius (Livy), History of Rome.
 Sextus Julius Frontinus, Strategemata (Stratagems).
 Publius Cornelius Tacitus, Annales, Historiae.
 Plutarchus, Lives of the Noble Greeks and Romans.
 Gaius Suetonius Tranquillus, De Vita Caesarum (Lives of the Caesars, or The Twelve Caesars).
 Appianus Alexandrinus (Appian), Bellum Civile (The Civil War).
 Jean Foy-Vaillant, Numismata Imperatorum Romanorum (1674).
 Joseph Hilarius Eckhel, Doctrina Numorum Veterum (The Study of Ancient Coins, 1792–1798).
 Dictionary of Greek and Roman Biography and Mythology, William Smith, ed., Little, Brown and Company, Boston (1849).
 Theodor Mommsen et alii, Corpus Inscriptionum Latinarum (The Body of Latin Inscriptions, abbreviated CIL), Berlin-Brandenburgische Akademie der Wissenschaften (1853–present).
 Wilhelm Dittenberger, Sylloge Inscriptionum Graecarum (Collection of Greek Inscriptions, abbreviated SIG), Leipzig (1883).
 T. Robert S. Broughton, The Magistrates of the Roman Republic, American Philological Association (1952–1986).
 Lily Ross Taylor, The Voting Districts of the Roman Republic, University of Michigan Press (1960).
 Michael Crawford, Roman Republican Coinage, Cambridge University Press (1974, 2001).

 
Roman gentes